Tommy Harris or Tommie Harris may refer to:

 Tommy Harris (baseball) (1923–1991), American Negro leagues baseball player
 Tommy Harris (rugby) (1927–2006), Welsh rugby league footballer, coach and administrator
 Tommy Harris (Coronation Street), a character from the British soap opera Coronation Street
 Tommy Harris (footballer) (1924–2001), English footballer
 Tomás Harris (1908–1964), British MI5 agent
 Tommie Harris (born 1983), American football defensive tackle

See also
 Thomas Harris (disambiguation)
 Tom Harris (disambiguation)